Metoxypilus werneri is a species of praying mantis found in New Guinea.

See also
List of mantis genera and species

References

Amorphoscelidae
Arthropods of New Guinea
Insects described in 1929